David Bingham (born November 19, 1948) is a former college baseball coach.

Bingham helped Emporia State to the NAIA World Series twice as a player. After playing briefly in as a shortstop in the Washington Senators system (hitting .174/.309/.207 in 34 games for the 1971 Geneva Senators), he was head coach at his alma mater, Kansas State Normal School/Emporia State from 1973 to 1987, going 557–270–2. From 1988 to 1995, he was at the University of Kansas, leading the Kansas Jayhawks baseball team to the 1993 College World Series while going 249–225 in eight seasons. In 2004, he was an assistant coach at the University of New Mexico for the baseball team and from August 2005 until 2011, he has been an assistant coach at the University of Nebraska for the baseball team.

Bingham was also an assistant coach for the U.S. team in the 1984 Summer Olympics, 1988 Baseball World Cup, and 1988 Summer Olympics.

Head coaching record

References

External links
 Nebraska profile

1948 births
Living people
Arizona Wildcats baseball players
Emporia State Hornets baseball players
Emporia State Hornets baseball coaches
Kansas Jayhawks baseball coaches
New Mexico Lobos baseball coaches
Nebraska Cornhuskers baseball coaches
Geneva Senators players